The Misuse of Drugs Act 1975 is a New Zealand drug control law that classifies drugs into three classes, or schedules, purportedly based on their projected risk of serious harm. However, in reality, classification of drugs outside of passing laws (such as this one), where the restriction has no legal power, is performed by the governor-general in conjunction with the Minister of Health, neither of whom is actually bound by law to obey this restriction.

In December 2018 it was amended to permit terminally ill patients to use marijuana without risk of prosecution.

Legislative history
The Misuse of Drugs Act was passed by the New Zealand Parliament into law in 1975.

On 11 December 2018, the Labour-led Coalition Government passed the Misuse of Drugs (Medicinal Cannabis) Amendment Act, which amended the existing law to permit terminally ill patients to use marijuana without risk of prosecution.

On 18 December 2018, the Government announced that it would also hold a referendum on legalizing recreational cannabis during the 2020 general election.

In March 2019, the Misuse of Drugs Amendment Bill was introduced. This added AMB-FUBINACA and 5F-ADB as Class A drugs; but most comment was around the phrase "affirm the existing discretion to prosecute", with lawyers and others saying that this would effectively mean an end to prosecution for mere possession of any drug. It was passed and became effective in August 2019.

In December 2020, the Act was amended by the Drug and Substance Checking Legislation Act 2020. This Act temporarily legalised drug checking in New Zealand. In November 2021, this change was made permanent by the Drug and Substance Checking Legislation Act 2021 making New Zealand the first nation to explicitly legalise drug checking.

Legislative features

Class A
First Schedule: Very high risk of harm and illegal:
Cocaine
Heroin
LSD
Mescaline
Methamphetamine
Phencyclidine (PCP)
Psilocin and psilocybin

Class B
Second Schedule: Very high risk of harm and on prescription:
Amphetamine
Cannabis (hashish, cannabis oil, or other preparation)
Ephedrine
GHB
Hydromorphone
MDMA (ecstasy)
Methadone
Morphine
Opium
Oxycodone
Pethidine
Pseudoephedrine

Class C
Third Schedule: Moderate risk of harm:
Barbiturates (phenobarbital, barbital, etc.)
Benzodiazepines (diazepam, alprazolam, lorazepam, nitrazepam, etc.)
Benzylpiperazine (BZP)
Cannabis (plant, leaf, fruit or seeds)
Codeine

: Pentobarbital, secobarbital and amobarbital are subject to more legal restrictions and tougher penalties than are other Class C substances.

: Temazepam and flunitrazepam are subject to more legal restrictions and tougher penalties than are other Class C substances.

Fourth Schedule
Precursor substances.

Conventions
The Expert Advisory Committee on Drugs (EACD) makes scheduling decisions, based on scientific and medical evidence and/or international treaty obligations. New Zealand is a party to the Single Convention on Narcotic Drugs, the Convention on Psychotropic Substances and the United Nations Convention Against Illicit Traffic in Narcotic Drugs and Psychotropic Substances.

National Drug Policy New Zealand notes, "The Conventions place certain obligations on signatory countries. When the UN classifies (or re-classifies) a substance under one of the above Conventions, it requires signatory countries to amend their domestic legislation to ensure consistency with the UN's amendment. Accordingly, the impetus for some of the drugs to be considered by the EACD will originate from decisions made at the UN".

See also
Alcohol in New Zealand
Cannabis in New Zealand
Presumption of supply in New Zealand
Psychoactive Substances Act 2013
Victimless crime

References

External links
Misuse of Drugs Act 1975 – text of the Act
Review of Misuse of Drugs Act 1975 at the New Zealand Law Commission

Statutes of New Zealand
Drug control law
1975 in New Zealand law
Drug policy of New Zealand